The Station nightclub fire occurred on the evening of February 20, 2003 at The Station, a nightclub and hard rock music venue in West Warwick, Rhode Island, United States, killing 100 people and injuring 230. During a concert by the rock band Great White, a pyrotechnic display ignited flammable acoustic foam in the walls and ceilings surrounding the stage. Within six minutes, the entire building was engulfed in flames. 

The fire was the fourth-deadliest at a nightclub in U.S. history, and the second-deadliest in New England, behind the 1942 Cocoanut Grove fire, which resulted in 492 deaths. 

After the fire, multiple civil and criminal cases were filed. Daniel Biechele, the tour manager for Great White who had ignited the pyrotechnics, plead guilty to 100 counts of involuntary manslaughter in 2006 and was sentenced to fifteen years in prison with four to serve. Biechele was released from prison in 2008 after some families of the victims expressed their support for his parole. Jeffrey and Michael Derderian, the owners of the Station, pleaded no contest and avoided a trial: Michael received the same sentence as Biechele and was released from prison in 2009, while Jeffrey received a sentence of 500 hours of community service. Legal action against several parties, including Great White, were resolved with monetary settlements by 2008.

Station Fire Memorial Park, a permanent memorial to the victims of the fire, was opened in May 2017 at the site where the Station once stood.

Background

The Station
The Station was a nightclub that was located on the corner of Cowesett Avenue and Kulas Road in West Warwick, Rhode Island. The building that would become The Station was built in 1946 and was originally used as a gin mill. 

Prior to being converted into a nightclub and concert venue, the Station building had been used as a restaurant and tavern. A fire had previously occurred at the building in 1972 while it was used as a restaurant called Julio's. No occupants were in the building during the 1972 fire, but the interior was significantly damaged. Another restaurant opened in the building in 1974. In 1985, it was converted to a pub, which closed sometime in the late 1980s, and a nightclub was opened in its place in 1991. The nightclub was purchased by brothers Michael and Jeffrey Derderian in March 2000.

In the months prior to the fire, the building had been inspected twice by West Warwick fire marshal Denis Larocque. The club was cited for nine minor code violations during the first inspection in November 2002, but was not cited for the flammable polyurethane foam the venue used for soundproofing, which was against code. The follow-up inspection in December 2002 also did not cite the foam, and the inspector gave the building an "All OK" rating on his inspection form. Larocque later told the Rhode Island State Police that he had not spotted the polyurethane foam during the November 2002 inspection because he was upset after finding an illegal inward swinging door that he had previously asked to be removed from the building.

Prior to the fire, the Station often hosted concerts by 1980s hard rock groups and tribute bands. Local bands that had played at the Station prior to the fire had used pyrotechnics during their concerts without incident, including a Kiss tribute band that had set off fireballs during their show in August 2002.

Great White

Great White, the headlining band of the February 20 concert, had risen to fame as part of the glam metal scene of the late 1980s and early 1990s. They were best known for their 1989 cover of Ian Hunter's "Once Bitten, Twice Shy", which reached the top ten of the Billboard Hot 100. At the time of their performance at the Station, Great White had two of its original members in its lineup: Lead singer Jack Russell and guitarist Mark Kendall. For the 2003 tour, the band was billed as "Jack Russell's Great White". Kendall, who had co-founded the band with Russell in 1977, had rejoined Russell's version of the group in 2002. The rest of the lineup included guitarist Ty Longley, who died in the fire, bass guitarist Dave Felice, and drummer Eric Powers. Great White's popularity had waned in the decade prior to the Station fire, and they had been performing on a touring circuit of small clubs with capacities of up to 500 people. Although the band was officially known as Jack Russell's Great White at the time, and their tour was initially named after Russell's 2002 solo album For You, they were billed by the Station as simply Great White.

In February 2003, Great White was on an eighteen date concert tour, and they had been using a pyrotechnic display during their performances that some club owners had denied them permission to use, citing safety concerns. Dominic Santana, the owner of The Stone Pony in Asbury Park, New Jersey, told reporters that Great White had used pyrotechnics during their February 14, 2003 performance at the venue without his permission, and their contract and rider did not mention pyrotechnics displays. In the aftermath of the fire, Great White and the owners of the Station disputed whether the band were allowed to use the pyrotechnic display during their concert.

Great White had two opening acts for the February 20 concert: Trip, a group from Vancouver, Washington, and Fathead, a local Rhode Island band. All the members of Trip escaped the Station without injury, but two members of Fathead, cousins Keith and Steven Mancini, died in the fire.

The concert was emceed by Michael Gonsalves, a disc jockey for Providence rock radio station WHJY who was also known as "Doctor Metal". Gonsalves was the host of the WHJY program The Metal Zone, at the time the longest-running heavy metal radio program in the United States.

Fire

Ignition
Great White started their performance at 11:07 p.m. on February 20. A total of 462 people were in attendance, even though the club's maximum licensed capacity was cited as 404.

The fire started shortly after Great White began performing their opening number, "Desert Moon". During the performance, pyrotechnics set off by tour manager Daniel Biechele ignited the flammable acoustic foam on both sides and the top center of the drummer's alcove at the back of the stage. The pyrotechnics were gerbs, cylindrical devices that produce a controlled spray of sparks. Biechele used four gerbs that were set to spray sparks  for fifteen seconds. Two gerbs were at 45-degree angles, with the middle two pointing straight up. The flanking gerbs became the principal cause of the fire. 

Sparks from the gerbs ignited the insulation foam, and flames were visible on the wall above the stage within nine seconds of their ignition. The flames were initially thought to be part of the act; only as the fire reached the ceiling and smoke began to bank down did people realize it was uncontrolled. Twenty seconds after the pyrotechnics ended, the band stopped playing and lead singer Jack Russell calmly remarked into the microphone, "Wow... that's not good." Within 40 seconds of the ignition, Great White had stopped playing and left the stage and the venue's fire alarm began to sound, but it was not connected to local fire department. The Station did not have a sprinkler system installed. Thick smoke began to fill the station one minute after the ignition and the crowd began to escape the building. The fire spread throughout the building and was completely engulfed within six minutes of the pyrotechnic ignition.

Response
By this time, the nightclub's fire alarm had activated, and although there were four possible exits, most people headed for the front door through which they had entered. The ensuing crowd crush in the narrow hallway led to that exit being blocked completely and resulted in numerous deaths and injuries among the patrons and staff.

The fire was reported to the West Warwick Fire Department by cellular phone calls to 911 within sixty seconds of ignition. A West Warwick police officer who was already at the scene also reported the fire to police dispatch. The first West Warwick fire engine arrived at the scene at 11:13 p.m., followed by three other trucks shortly thereafter. Hundreds of firefighters responded to the fire, including every available West Warwick firefighter. Fire departments in Warwick, Coventry, and Cranston rendered mutual aid to the fire site. The Cowesett Inn restaurant across the street from the Station acted as an ad-hoc burn triage and command center for first responders. A portion of the nightclub roof collapsed at 11:57 p.m., and a second portion in the building's sunroom collapsed at 12:07 a.m.. Patients were transported to Kent Hospital, which was filled to maximum capacity due to the fire. By 1:30 a.m. on February 21, all patients had been transported and the street had been cleared.

Aftermath and casualties

Of the 462 people in the building for the concert, 100 were killed, 230 were injured, and 132 escaped uninjured. The initial death toll was 96 people; Four more individuals died in the hospital in the weeks following, bringing the toll to 100.

Among those who died in the fire were Great White guitarist Ty Longley, and the show's emcee, WHJY DJ Mike "The Doctor" Gonsalves. Longley reportedly died after returning to the building to retrieve his guitar. 

Four employees of the Station were killed in the fire. In April 2003, The Derderians were fined $1.07 million for failing to carry workers' compensation insurance for their employees. The fine was not resolved until 2013, ten years after the fire, when it was upheld by a judge. One survivor claimed that a bouncer blocked a side door as attendees attempted to escape the building, stating the door was only to be used by the band.

Providence Phoenix columnist Ian Donnis wrote of the effect that the fire had on the close-knit Rhode Island community, "The loss of so much life would represent a tragedy anywhere, but it struck especially hard in Rhode Island, the nation's smallest state, where no place is more than an hour away by car and the fire claimed one tenth of one percent of the state's population." 

Many of the survivors of the fire developed post-traumatic stress disorder after the event.

Recording and account
The fire, from its inception, was caught on videotape by cameraman Brian Butler for WPRI-TV of Providence, and the beginning of that tape was released to national news stations. Butler was there for a planned piece on nightclub safety being reported by Jeffrey A. Derderian, a WPRI news reporter who was also a part-owner of The Station. The report had been inspired by the E2 nightclub stampede in Chicago that killed 21 people three days earlier. Derderian had begun working for WPRI on February 17, three days before the fire. WPRI-TV and Derderian were criticized for the conflict of interest in having a reporter do a report concerning his own property. Derderian resigned from WPRI on June 30.

At the scene of the fire, Butler gave this account of the tragedy:

Investigation

NIST report
A National Institute of Standards and Technology (NIST) investigation of the fire under the authority of the National Construction Safety Team Act, using computer simulations with FDS and a mockup of the stage area and dance floor, concluded that a fire sprinkler system would have contained the fire long enough to give everyone time to exit safely. The Station, which was built in 1946, was exempt from a sprinkler requirement in the state fire code through a grandfather clause, which stated that buildings constructed before 1976 were not required to have a sprinkler system. The NIST report was released on March 3, 2005 and was made available in two parts on June 30, 2005.

Grand jury investigation
An investigation of the fire by a Rhode Island state grand jury was started by then-Rhode Island Attorney General Patrick Lynch  on February 26, 2003.  On December 9, 2003, the grand jury announced indictments against Station owners Jeffrey and Michael Derderian and Great White road manager Daniel M. Biechele. The three were each charged with 100 counts of involuntary manslaughter with criminal negligence and 100 counts of involuntary manslaughter in violation of a misdemeanor. Larocque was not charged by the grand jury, as Lynch had cited a state law that prevented charges against fire marshals without proof of bad faith. The grand jury also did not return charges against Russell.

Lynch told 48 Hours that his investigation found that the fire spread quickly due to the foam the Derderians had installed in the Station's walls and ceilings as a response to noise complaints. The lack of usable exits were also a factor, as was the inward door that Larocque had found and asked to be removed. Jeffrey Derderian said the door was also installed due to noise, and they had removed it as asked, but sometimes re-installed it if the venue was going to be loud that night, and it was used by the band to escape the building during the fire. Michael Derderian told 48 Hours that it was "Undisputable" that the building's use of flammable packing foam instead of flame retardant sound foam was the cause of the fire's spread, but the brothers claimed that they had ordered sound foam and had received the packing foam instead.

Other causes
The foam was sold to the Derderians by American Foam. In 2005, the Rhode Island Attorney General office received a fax from Barry Warner, a former employee of American Foam who lived nearby the Station, who claimed the company had known about the dangers of polyurethane foam but did not warn their employees about it. Although Warner was called to testify to a grand jury, he was not asked about the fax. American Foam refuted the claims in Warner's fax. In 2008, American Foam agreed to pay $6.3 million to the families of the victims of the fire.

Victims' families have also cited overcrowding in the venue as a cause for the causalities during the fire. Larocque had set various capacities for the Station in the years prior to the fire based on whether pool tables and other items could be moved. The capacity for the Station was either 258 or 404, depending on how the building was being used. The final tally by The Providence Journal of people inside the Station during the fire totaled 462.

Criminal trials

Daniel Biechele

The first criminal trial was against Great White's tour manager, Daniel Michael Biechele, 26, from Orlando, Florida. This trial was scheduled to start May 1, 2006, but Biechele, against his lawyers' advice, pleaded guilty to 100 counts of involuntary manslaughter on February 7, 2006, in what he said was an effort to "bring peace, I want this to be over with."

Sentencing and statement
On May 10, 2006, State Prosecutor Randall White asked that Biechele be sentenced to ten years in prison, the maximum allowed under the plea bargain, citing the massive loss of life in the fire and the need to send a message. Speaking to the public for the first time since the fire, Biechele stated:

Superior Court Judge Francis J. Darigan Jr. sentenced Biechele to fifteen years in prison, with four to serve and eleven years suspended, plus three years' probation, for his role in the fire. Darigan remarked, "The greatest sentence that can be imposed on you has been imposed on you by yourself."  Biechele was released in March 2008.

The sentence drew mixed reactions in the courtroom. Many of the families believed that the punishment was just; others had hoped for a more severe sentence.

Support for parole and aftermath

On September 4, 2007, some families of the fire's victims expressed their support for Biechele's parole. Leland Hoisington, whose 28-year-old daughter, Abbie, was killed in the fire, told reporters, "I think they should not even bother with a hearing—just let Biechele out... I just don't find him as guilty of anything." The state parole board received approximately twenty letters, the majority of which expressed their sympathy and support for Biechele, some going as far as to describe him as a "scapegoat" with limited responsibility. Parole board chairwoman Lisa Holley told journalists of her surprise at the forgiving attitude of the families, saying, "I think the most overwhelming part of it for me was the depth of forgiveness of many of these families that have sustained such a loss."

Dave Kane and Joanne O'Neill, parents of youngest victim Nicholas O'Neill, released their letter to the board to reporters. "In the period following this tragedy, it was Mr. Biechele, alone, who stood up and admitted responsibility for his part in this horrible event... He apologized to the families of the victims and made no attempt to mitigate his guilt," the letter said. Others pointed out that Biechele had sent handwritten letters to the families of each of the 100 victims and that he had a work release position in a local charity.

On September 19, 2007, the Rhode Island Parole Board announced that Biechele would be released in March 2008. Biechele was released from prison on March 19, 2008.

Biechele's parole and probation expired in March 2011. , Biechele lived in Florida with his wife and two children.

Michael and Jeffrey Derderian
Following Biechele's trial, The Station's owners, Michael and Jeffrey Derderian, were scheduled to receive separate trials. However, on September 21, 2006, Judge Darigan announced that the brothers had changed their pleas from "not guilty" to "no contest," thereby avoiding a trial. Michael Derderian received fifteen years in prison, with four to serve and eleven years suspended, plus three years' probation—the same sentence as Biechele. Jeffrey Derderian received 500 hours of community service.

In a letter to the victims' families, Judge Darigan wrote that he accepted the deal because he wanted to avoid "Public exposition of the tragic, explicit and horrific events experienced by the victims of this fire, both living and dead." He added that the difference in the brothers' sentences reflected their respective involvement with the purchase and installation of the flammable foam. Rhode Island Attorney General Patrick C. Lynch objected strenuously to the plea bargain, saying that both brothers should have received jail time and that Michael Derderian should have received more time than Biechele.

In January 2008, the Parole Board decided to grant Michael Derderian an early release; he was scheduled to be released from prison in September 2009, but was granted his release in June 2009 for good behavior.

Civil settlements
As of September 2008, at least $115 million in settlement agreements had been paid, or offered, to the victims or their families by various defendants.:
In September 2008, The Jack Russell Tour Group Inc. offered $1 million in a settlement to survivors and victims' relatives, the maximum allowed under the band's insurance plan.
Club owners Jeffrey and Michael Derderian reached a settlement of $813,000 with survivors and victims' families in September 2008.
The State of Rhode Island and the town of West Warwick agreed to pay $10 million as settlement.
Sealed Air Corporation agreed to pay $25 million as settlement. Sealed Air made polyethylene foam that had been installed at the Station in 1996, which produced toxic gas when it burned during the fire.
In February 2008, Providence television station WPRI-TV and their then-owners LIN TV made an out-of-court settlement of $30 million as a result of the claim that their video journalist was said to be obstructing escape and not sufficiently helping people exit.
In March 2008, JBL Speakers settled out of court for $815,000. JBL was accused of using flammable foam inside their speakers. The company denied any wrongdoing.
Anheuser-Busch has offered $5 million. McLaughlin & Moran, Anheuser-Busch's distributor, has offered $16 million.
Home Depot and Polar Industries, Inc. (a Connecticut-based insulation company) made a settlement offer of $5 million.
Providence radio station WHJY-FM promoted the show, which was emcee'd by its DJ, Mike "The Doctor" Gonsalves (who was one of the casualties that night). Clear Channel Broadcasting, WHJY's parent company, paid a settlement of $22 million in February 2008.
American Foam Corporation, who sold the insulation to The Station nightclub, agreed in 2008 to pay $6.3 million to settle lawsuits relating to the fire.

In 2021, 48 Hours described the total civil payments to the victims and families as $176 million.

Memorials and benefits

Thousands of mourners attended an interfaith memorial service at St. Gregory the Great Church in Warwick on February 24, 2003, to remember those lost in the fire. Another memorial was later that night the West Warwick Civic Center.

A benefit memorial concert was held in February 2008 at the Dunkin' Donuts Center in Providence and featured performances by Tesla, Twisted Sister, Winger, Gretchen Wilson, and John Rich. The event raised at least $25,000 in donations for the Station Family Fund, and was broadcast in March by VH1 and VH1 Classic.

On the twentieth anniversary of the fire on February 20, 2023, Rhode Island governor Dan McKee ordered flags in Rhode Island lowered to half-staff for the day and the Rhode Island State House to be illuminated in memory of the 100 victims.

Station Fire Memorial Park

The site of the fire was cleared, and a multitude of crosses were placed as memorials, left by loved ones of the deceased. On May 20, 2003, nondenominational services began to be held at the site of the fire for a number of months. Access remains open to the public, and memorial services are held each February 20.

A permanent memorial at the site of the fire has been erected and named the Station Fire Memorial Park. In August 2016, the site was reported to have been being used as a PokeStop in Pokémon Go, to uproar from victims' families. The stop was removed from the game by developer Niantic later that month.

In June 2003, the Station Fire Memorial Foundation (SFMF) was formed with the purpose of purchasing the property, to build and maintain a memorial. In September 2012, the owner of the land, Ray Villanova, donated the site to the SFMF. By April 2016, $1.65 million of the $2 million fundraising goal had been achieved and construction of the Station Fire Memorial Park had commenced. The memorial dedication ceremony took place on May 21, 2017.

Aftermath

Great White, Jack Russell, and Mark Kendall
Russell considered disbanding Great White after the fire, but reconsidered when he decided to embark on a benefit tour. The tour started five months after the fire, and each concert began with a prayer for survivors and families. The band raised $185,000 for the Station Family Fund during the tour. The band initially retired "Desert Moon", the song they were performing when the fire began, from their concert set list. "I don't think I could ever sing that song again," said Russell. Kendall said in 2005, "We haven't played that song. Things that bring back memories of that night we try to stay away from. And that song reminds us of that night. We haven't played it since then and probably never will."

Two years to the day after the fire, band members Russell and Kendall, along with Great White's attorney, Ed McPherson, appeared on CNN's Larry King Live with three survivors of the fire and the father of Longley, to discuss how their lives had changed since the incident.

Russell left Great White in 2010. In the years following the fire, Great White split into two separate groups, one led by Russell and the other by Kendall. Kendall's version of the band holds the copyright for the Great White name. When Russell launched his version of the band in 2012, Kendall's group responded that Russell had no right to use the name. After a 2013 legal settlement between the two parties, Kendall's band retained the Great White name, while Russell's band was allowed to use the name Jack Russell's Great White. By 2013, Russell's group had resumed playing "Desert Moon". 

Russell performed a benefit show in February 2013 in Hermosa Beach, California in commemoration of the tenth anniversary of the fire. Russell planned to donate the proceeds to the Station Fire Memorial Foundation, but the organization asked to be disassociated from the concert, citing the animosity still felt by many of the survivors and surviving families. Russell raised about $180 from the concert, but the Memorial Foundation refused the donation, a decision supported by Kendall. In 2013, Kendall told The Providence Journal that he maintained amicable contact with some survivors, victims' families, and the Station Fire Memorial Foundation. Russell's relation with some survivors and families has been strained, although he remains close to Longley's family.

Neither version of Great White performed in any of the six New England states for over a decade following the fire. Russell's group made its first New England appearance in twelve years at a harvest festival in Mechanic Falls, Maine, in August 2015. Kendall's version of Great White was to perform at the Mohegan Sun casino in Uncasville, Connecticut alongside Stryper and Steven Adler on March 25, 2023, but the venue indefinitely postponed the concert on March 2, citing its proximity to the twentieth anniversary of the fire.

Others
41, a documentary about Nicholas O'Neill, the youngest victim of the fire, was screened at Rhode Island theaters in 2008. 41 and a film based on O'Neill's play They Walk Among Us were aired by Rhode Island PBS in February 2013 in conjunction with the tenth anniversary of the fire.

Gonsalves was inducted into the Rhode Island Radio and Television Hall of Fame in 2013.

The Derderian brothers conducted their first television interview about the fire in 2021 for 48 Hours. Some victims' families criticized the 48 Hours segment and the Derderians' involvement.

Safety measures
Following the tragedy, Governor Donald Carcieri declared a moratorium on pyrotechnic displays at venues that hold fewer than 300 people. The Rhode Island state fire code was changed after the fire to require every nightclub in the state with a capacity of over 150 people to have a sprinkler system installed.
 
As numerous violations of existing codes contributed to the severity of the fire, there was immediate effort to strengthen fire code protections. Within weeks, the National Fire Protection Association committee met to regulate code for "assembly occupancies." Based upon its work, Tentative Interim Amendments (TIAs) were issued for the national standard "Life Safety Code" (NFPA 101), in July 2003. The TIAs required automatic fire sprinklers in all existing nightclubs and similar locations that accommodate more than 100 occupants, and all new locations in the same categories. The TIAs also required additional crowd manager personnel, among other things. These TIAs were subsequently incorporated into the 2006 edition of NFPA 101, along with additional exit requirements for new nightclub occupancies. It is left for each state or local jurisdiction to legally enact and enforce the current code changes.

As a result of this and other similar incidents, fire chiefs, fire marshals and inspectors require trained crowd managers to comply with the International Fire Code, NFPA-101 Life Safety Code, NFPA-1 Fire Code and many local ordinances that address safety in public-assembly occupancies. However, fire professionals have few choices about what training should be provided and training programs are continually updated to incorporate new technologies as well as lessons learned from actual fire experiences.

Legislation

Inspired by the fire, the Fire Sprinkler Incentive Act has been proposed United States Senate and House of Representatives since 2003. The legislation would create a tax incentive for property owners to install fire sprinkler systems. It was last introduced in the House in 2015 by then-U.S. Reps. James Langevin of Rhode Island and Tom Reed of New York.

See also

 List of nightclub fires

References

Further reading

External links
 The Boston Globe: "Portraits of People Who Died in the R.I. Nightclub Fire" (2003)
 National Fire Protection Association web page "Nightclubs/assembly occupancies": Includes a report on the fire, links to nightclub safety tips, information on safe use of pyrotechnics, and other relevant information.
 NIST simulations of the fire: without sprinklers; with sprinklers
 Full NIST government investigation
 Guide to the Station Nightclub Victims' Collection from the Rhode Island State Archives

 
2003 fires in the United States
2003 in Rhode Island
Accidental deaths in Rhode Island
Building and structure fires in the United States
Concert disasters
February 2003 events in the United States
Fire disasters involving barricaded escape routes
Fires in Rhode Island
Human stampedes in 2003
Human stampedes in the United States
Kent County, Rhode Island
Nightclub fires started by pyrotechnics
Nightclubs in the United States
West Warwick, Rhode Island